Roamler is a Dutch information technology company which specializes in using crowd-sourcing for business in the Retail, Tech and Care sectors.

The company was founded in 2011, and provides businesses with B2B Crowd-supported solutions by managing a large network of on-demand professionals.

These on-demand professionals are called “Roamlers", and are recruited and organised according to skillset, experience and physical location before being matched to tasks. This helps businesses increase their flexibility and provides professionals with a wider range of personal and professional growth opportunities. 

Roamler's HQ is located in Amsterdam, and the company has offices in the UK, Spain, Germany, France and Belgium and licensed partners in Italy and Turkey.

History
Roamler was founded in June 2011 by Wiggert de Haan and Martijn Nijhuis, two Dutch entrepreneurs.

In 2015 the company opened branches in the United Kingdom, Germany, Belgium, Spain and France and started partnerships in Italy and Turkey.

At the beginning of 2016, Roamler launched the Tech branch, as first Dutch company to apply the principles of crowd-sourcing to the professional home installations market.

In April 2016 Roamler completed a 4.5 million euro investment, co-founded by Endeit Capital, to expand its activities further. In 2020, the company received another 20M euros funding. In 2021, Roamler acquired two companies to expand services throughout Europe.

Developments

System and Software 
Roamler makes use of proprietary software for its front and back-end activities.

The Roamler app is available for both iOS and Android upon registration.

Users are ranked according to experience points and levels. In order to be able to perform paid tasks, a user must reach level 2.

The app also contains an instant message platform, through which users can communicate directly with the company support department.

References 

Technology companies established in 2011
Companies based in Amsterdam
2011 establishments in the Netherlands
Information technology companies of the Netherlands